R.C. Mechelen history and statistics in FIBA Europe and Euroleague Basketball (company) competitions.

1960s

1965–66 FIBA European Champions Cup, 1st–tier
The 1965–66 FIBA European Champions Cup was the 9th installment of the European top-tier level professional basketball club competition FIBA European Champions Cup (now called EuroLeague), running from November 3, 1965 to April 1, 1966. The trophy was won by Simmenthal Milano, who defeated Slavia VŠ Praha by a result of 77–72 at Palazzo dello sport in Bologna, Italy.  Overall, Racing Mechelen achieved in present competition a record of 7 wins against 3 defeats, in three successive rounds. More detailed:

First round 
 Tie played on November 12, 1965 and on November 16, 1965.

|}

Second round
 Tie played on December 9, 1965 and on December 16, 1965.

|}

Quarterfinals
 Day 1 (January 12, 1966) / Day 2 (January 21, 1966)

|}

 Day 3 (February 10, 1966) / Day 4 (February 18, 1966)

|}

 Day 5 (March 9, 1966) / Day 6 (March 17, 1966)

|}

 Group A standings:

1966–67 FIBA European Champions Cup, 1st–tier
The 1966–67 FIBA European Champions Cup was the 10th installment of the European top-tier level professional basketball club competition FIBA European Champions Cup (now called EuroLeague), running from November 6, 1966 to April 1, 1967. The trophy was won by Real Madrid, who defeated the title holder Simmenthal Milano by a result of 91–83 at their home venue Pabellón de la Ciudad Deportiva, in Madrid, Spain.  Overall, Racing Mechelen achieved in present competition a record of 4 wins against 4 defeats, in two successive rounds. More detailed:

Second round
 Tie played on December 8, 1966 and on December 15, 1966.

|}

Quarterfinals
 Day 1 (January 11, 1967) / Day 2 (January 18, 1967)

|}

 Day 3 (February 2, 1967) / Day 4 (February 8, 1967)

|}

 Day 5 (February 23, 1967) / Day 6 (March 2, 1967)

|}

 Group B standings:

1967–68 FIBA European Champions Cup, 1st–tier
The 1967–68 FIBA European Champions Cup was the 11th installment of the European top-tier level professional basketball club competition FIBA European Champions Cup (now called EuroLeague), running from November 9, 1967 to April 11, 1968. The trophy was won by the title holder Real Madrid, who defeated Spartak ZJŠ Brno by a result of 98–95 at Palais des Sports in Lyon, France.  Overall, Racing Bell Mechelen achieved in present competition a record of 4 wins against 4 defeats, in two successive rounds. More detailed:

Second round
 Tie played on December 10, 1967 and on December 14, 1967.

|}

Quarterfinals
 Day 1 (January 25, 1968) / Day 2 (February 1, 1968)

|}
*Racing Bell Mechelen was punished with a forfeit (2–0) in this game after they scored an own basket to tie the game 74–74, trying to go into a five minutes extra-time that could allow the Belgian team to overcome the -16 points difference from the first leg. However Maccabi Tel Aviv scored one more point before the end and the final score was 74–75 for the Israeli team. In any case, FIBA decided to cancel this game and declared Maccabi winner by forfeit.

 Day 3 (February 14, 1968) / Day 4 (February 22, 1968)

|}

 Day 3 (March 7, 1968) / Day 4 (March 14, 1968)

|}

 Group B standings:

1970s

1969–70 FIBA European Champions Cup, 1st–tier
The 1969–70 FIBA European Champions Cup was the 13th installment of the European top-tier level professional basketball club competition FIBA European Champions Cup (now called EuroLeague), running from November 6, 1969 to April 4, 1970. The trophy was won by Ignis Varese, who defeated the title holder CSKA Moscow, by a result of 79–74 at Sportska Dvorana Skenderija in Sarajevo, SFR Yugoslavia.  Overall, Racing Bell Mechelen achieved in present competition a record of 8 wins against 2 defeats, in three successive rounds. More detailed:

First round
 Tie played on November 6, 1969 and on November 13, 1969.

|}

Second round
 Tie played on December 4, 1969 and on December 11, 1969.

|}

Quarterfinals
 Day 1 (January 15, 1970) / Day 2 (January 22, 1970)

|}

 Day 3 (February 5, 1970) / Day 4 (February 12, 1970)

|}

 Day 5 (February 19, 1970) / Day 6 (February 25, 1970)

|}

 Group A standings:

1970–71 FIBA European Cup Winners' Cup, 2nd–tier
The 1970–71 FIBA European Cup Winners' Cup was the 5th installment of FIBA's 2nd-tier level European-wide professional club basketball competition FIBA European Cup Winners' Cup (lately called FIBA Saporta Cup), running from December 3, 1970 to April 7, 1971. The trophy was won by Simmenthal Milano, who defeated Spartak Leningrad in a two-legged final on a home and away basis.  Overall, Racing Bell Mechelen achieved in present competition a record of 2 wins against 2 defeats, in two successive rounds. More detailed:

First round
 Tie played on December 3, 1970 and on December 10, 1970.

|}

Second round
 Tie played on January 6, 1971 and on January 14, 1971.

|}

1971–72 FIBA European Cup Winners' Cup, 2nd–tier
The 1971–72 FIBA European Cup Winners' Cup was the 6th installment of FIBA's 2nd-tier level European-wide professional club basketball competition FIBA European Cup Winners' Cup (lately called FIBA Saporta Cup), running from November 4, 1971 to March 21, 1972. The trophy was won by the title holder Simmenthal Milano, who defeated Crvena zvezda by a result of 74–70 at Alexandreio Melathron in Thessaloniki, Greece.  Overall, Racing Bell Mechelen achieved in present competition a record of 5 wins against 3 defeats, in three successive rounds. More detailed:

First round
 Tie played on November 4, 1971 and on November 11, 1971.

|}

Second round
 Tie played on December 2, 1971 and on December 9, 1971.

|}

Quarterfinals
 Day 1 (January 6, 1972) / Day 2 (January 13, 1972)

|}

 Day 3 (February 10, 1972) / Day 4 (February 15, 1972)

|}

 Group A standings:

1973 FIBA Korać Cup, 3rd–tier 
The 1973 FIBA Korać Cup was the 2nd installment of the European 3rd-tier level professional basketball club competition FIBA Korać Cup, running from January 9, 1973 to March 27, 1973. The trophy was won by Birra Forst Cantù, who defeated Maes Pils in a two-legged final on a home and away basis.  Overall, Maes Pils achieved in present competition a record of 5 wins against 3 defeats, in three successive rounds. More detailed:

Top 12
 Day 1 (January 10, 1973) / Day 2 (January 17, 1973)

|}

 Day 5 (February 7, 1973) / Day 6 (February 14, 1973)

|}

 Group A standings:

Semifinals
 Tie played on February 27, 1973 and on March 6, 1973.

|}

Finals
 Tie played on March 20, 1973 at Palazzetto dello Sport Parini in Cantù, Italy and on March 27, 1973 at Sporthal Winketkaai in Mechelen, Belgium.

|}

1973–74 FIBA Korać Cup, 3rd–tier
The 1973–74 FIBA Korać Cup was the 3rd installment of the European 3rd-tier level professional basketball club competition FIBA Korać Cup, running from November 6, 1973 to April 11, 1974. The trophy was won by the title holder Birra Forst Cantù, who defeated Partizan in a two-legged final on a home and away basis.  Overall, Maes Pils achieved in present competition a record of 2 wins against 2 defeats, in two successive rounds. More detailed:

First round
 Tie played on November 6, 1973 and on November 13, 1973.

|}

Second round
 Tie played on November 27, 1973 and on December 4, 1973.

|}

1974–75 FIBA European Champions Cup, 1st–tier
The 1974–75 FIBA European Champions Cup was the 18th installment of the European top-tier level professional basketball club competition FIBA European Champions Cup (now called EuroLeague), running from November 7, 1974 to April 10, 1975. The trophy was won by Ignis Varese, who defeated the title holder Real Madrid by a result of 79–65 at Arena Deurne in Antwerp, Belgium.  Overall, Maes Pils achieved in present competition a record of 4 wins against 7 defeats, plus 1 draw, in two successive rounds. More detailed:

Second round
Tie played on November 28, 1974 and on December 5, 1974.

|}

Top 12
 Day 1 (January 3, 1975) / Day 2 (January 8, 1975)

|}

 Day 3 (January 16, 1975) / Day 4 (January 23, 1975)

|}

 Day 5 (January 30, 1975) / Day 6 (February 6, 1975)

|}

 Day 7 (February 13, 1975) / Day 8 (February 20, 1975)

|}

 Day 9 (February 27, 1975) / Day 10 (March 5, 1975)

|}

 Group A standings:

1975–76 FIBA European Champions Cup, 1st–tier
The 1975–76 FIBA European Champions Cup was the 19th installment of the European top-tier level professional basketball club competition FIBA European Champions Cup (now called EuroLeague), running from October 30, 1975 to April 1, 1976. The trophy was won by the title holder Mobilgirgi Varese, who defeated Real Madrid by a result of 81–74 at Patinoire des Vernets in Geneva, Switzerland.  Overall, Maes Pils achieved in present competition a record of 5 wins against 4 defeats, plus 1 draw, in two successive rounds. More detailed:

Second round
 Bye: Maes Pils qualified without games.

Top 12
 Day 1 (December 11, 1975) / Day 2 (December 18, 1975)

|}

 Day 3 (January 8, 1976) / Day 4 (January 15, 1976)

|}

 Day 5 (January 22, 1976) / Day 6 (January 29, 1976)

|}

 Day 7 (February 5, 1976) / Day 8 (February 12, 1976)

|}

 Day 9 (February 19, 1976) / Day 10 (February 26, 1976)

|}

 Group A standings:

1976–77 FIBA European Champions Cup, 1st–tier
The 1976–77 FIBA European Champions Cup was the 20th installment of the European top-tier level professional basketball club competition FIBA European Champions Cup (now called EuroLeague), running from October 14, 1976 to April 7, 1977. The trophy was won by Maccabi Tel Aviv, who defeated the title holder Mobilgirgi Varese by result of 78–77 at Hala Pionir in Belgrade, SFR Yugoslavia. Aviv]].  Overall, Maes Pils achieved in present competition a record of 10 wins against 6 defeats, in two successive rounds. More detailed:

First round
 Day 1 (October 14, 1976)

|}

 Day 2 (October 21, 1976)

|}

 Day 3 (October 28, 1976)

|}

 Day 4 (November 4, 1976)

|}

 Day 5 (November 18, 1976)

|}

 Day 6 (November 25, 1976)

|}

 Group D standings:

Semifinals
 Day 1 (December 8, 1976)

|}

 Day 2 (December 16, 1976)

|}

 Day 3 (January 13, 1977)

|}

 Day 4 (January 20, 1977)

|}

 Day 5 (January 27, 1977)

|}

 Day 6 (February 10, 1977)

|}

 Day 7 (February 17, 1977)

|}

 Day 8 (March 3, 1977)

|}

 Day 9 (March 10, 1977)

|}

 Day 10 (March 24, 1977)

|}

 Semifinals group stage standings:

1978–79 FIBA Korać Cup, 3rd–tier
The 1978–79 FIBA Korać Cup was the 8th installment of the European 3rd-tier level professional basketball club competition FIBA Korać Cup, running from October 31, 1978 to March 20, 1979. The trophy was won by the title holder Partizan, who defeated Arrigoni Rieti by a result of 108–98 at Hala Pionir in Belgrade, SFR Yugoslavia.  Overall, Maes Pils achieved in present competition a record of 1 win against 1 defeat, in one round. More detailed:

Second round
 Tie played on November 21, 1978 and on November 28, 1978.

|}

1980s

1980–81 FIBA European Champions Cup, 1st–tier
The 1980–81 FIBA European Champions Cup was the 24th installment of the European top-tier level professional basketball club competition FIBA European Champions Cup (now called EuroLeague), running from October 9, 1980 to March 26, 1981. The trophy was won by Maccabi Tel Aviv, who defeated Sinudyne Bologna by a result of 80–79 at the Hall Rhénus in Strasbourg, France.  Overall, Maes Pils achieved in present competition a record of 3 wins against 3 defeats, in one round. More detailed:

First round
 Day 1 (October 9, 1980)

|}

 Day 2 (October 16, 1980)

|}

 Day 3 (October 30, 1980)

|}

 Day 4 (November 6, 1980)

|}

 Day 5 (November 13, 1980)

|}

 Day 6 (November 20, 1980)

|}

 Group F standings:

1981–82 FIBA Korać Cup, 3rd–tier
The 1981–82 FIBA Korać Cup was the 11th installment of the European 3rd-tier level professional basketball club competition FIBA Korać Cup, running from October 7, 1981 to March 18, 1982. The trophy was won by Limoges CSP, who defeated Šibenka by a result of 90–84 at Palasport San Lazzaro in Padua, Italy.  Overall, Maes Pils achieved in present competition a record of 2 wins against 2 defeats, in two successive rounds. More detailed:

First round
 Tie played on October 7, 1981 and on October 14, 1981.

|}

Second round
 Tie played on November 4, 1981 and on November 11, 1981.

|}

1982–83 FIBA Korać Cup, 3rd–tier
The 1982–83 FIBA Korać Cup was the 12th installment of the European 3rd-tier level professional basketball club competition FIBA Korać Cup, running from October 6, 1982 to March 8, 1983. The trophy was won by the title holder Limoges CSP, who defeated -for second consecutive time- Šibenka by a result of 94–86 at Deutschlandhalle in West Berlin, West Germany.  Overall, Maes Pils achieved in present competition a record of 3 wins against 7 defeats, in three successive rounds. More detailed:

First round
 Tie played on October 6, 1982 and on October 13, 1982.

|}

Second round
 Tie played on November 3, 1982 and on November 10, 1982.

|}

Top 16
 Day 1 (December 8, 1982)

|}

 Day 2 (December 15, 1982)

|}

 Day 3 (January 12, 1983)

|}

 Day 4 (January 19, 1983)

|}

 Day 5 (January 26, 1983)

|}

 Day 6 (February 2, 1983)

|}

 Group B standings:

1984–85 FIBA Korać Cup, 3rd–tier
The 1984–85 FIBA Korać Cup was the 14th installment of the European 3rd-tier level professional basketball club competition FIBA Korać Cup, running from October 3, 1984 to March 21, 1985. The trophy was won by Simac Milano, who defeated Ciaocrem Varese by a result of 91–78 at Palais du Midi in Brussels, Belgium.  Overall, Maes Pils achieved in present competition a record of 1 win against 1 defeat, in only one round. More detailed:

First round
 Tie played on October 3, 1984 and on October 10, 1984.

|}

1985–86 FIBA Korać Cup, 3rd–tier
The 1985–86 FIBA Korać Cup was the 15th installment of the European 3rd-tier level professional basketball club competition FIBA Korać Cup, running from October 2, 1985 to March 27, 1986. The trophy was won by Banco di Roma Virtus, who defeated Mobilgirgi Caserta in a two-legged final on a home and away basis.  Overall, Maes Pils achieved in present competition a record of 3 wins against 1 defeats, in two successive rounds. More detailed:

First round
 Tie played on October 2, 1985 and on October 9, 1985.

|}

Second round
 Tie played on October 30, 1985 and on November 6, 1985.

|}

1986–87 FIBA European Cup Winners' Cup, 2nd–tier
The 1986–87 FIBA European Cup Winners' Cup was the 21st installment of FIBA's 2nd-tier level European-wide professional club basketball competition FIBA European Cup Winners' Cup (lately called FIBA Saporta Cup), running from September 30, 1986, to March 17, 1987. The trophy was won by Cibona, who defeated Scavolini Pesaro by a result of 89–74 at Dvorana SPC Vojvodina in Novi Sad, SFR Yugoslavia.  Overall, Maes Pils achieved in present competition a record of 5 wins against 5 defeats, in three successive rounds. More detailed:

First round
 Tie played on September 30, 1986 and on October 7, 1986.

|}

Second round
 Tie played on October 28, 1986 and on November 4, 1986.

|}

Quarterfinals
 Day 1 (December 2, 1986)

|}

 Day 2 (December 9, 1986)

|}

 Day 3 (January 6, 1987)

|}

 Day 4 (January 13, 1987)

|}

 Day 5 (January 20, 1987)

|}

 Day 6 (January 27, 1987)

|}

 Group B standings:

1987–88 FIBA European Champions Cup, 1st–tier
The 1987–88 FIBA European Champions Cup was the 31st installment of the European top-tier level professional basketball club competition FIBA European Champions Cup (now called EuroLeague), running from September 24, 1987 to April 7, 1988. The trophy was won by the title holder Tracer Milano, who defeated -for second consecutive time- Maccabi Tel Aviv by a result of 90–84 at Flanders Expo Pavilion in Ghent, Belgium.  Overall, Maes Pils achieved in present competition a record of 1 win against 1 defeat, in only one round. More detailed:

First round
 Tie played on September 24, 1987 and on October 1, 1987.

|}

1988–89 FIBA Korać Cup, 3rd–tier
The 1988–89 FIBA Korać Cup was the 18th installment of the European 3rd-tier level professional basketball club competition FIBA Korać Cup, running from October 12, 1988 to March 22, 1989. The trophy was won by Partizan, who defeated Wiwa Vismara Cantù in a two-legged final on a home and away basis.  Overall, Maes Pils achieved in present competition a record of 3 wins against 7 defeats, in three successive rounds. More detailed:

First round
 Tie played on October 12, 1988 and on October 19, 1988.

|}
*The score in the second leg at the end of the regulation was 84–76 for Benfica, so it was necessary to play an extra-time to decide the winner of this match.

Second round
 Tie played on November 2, 1988 and November 9, 1988.

|}

Top 16
 Day 1 (December 7, 1988)

|}

 Day 2 (December 14, 1988)

|}

 Day 3 (January 11, 1989)

|}

 Day 4 (January 18, 1989)

|}

 Day 5 (January 25, 1989)

|}

 Day 6 (February 1, 1989)

|}

 Group C standings:

1990s

1989–90 FIBA European Champions Cup, 1st–tier
The 1989–90 FIBA European Champions Cup was the 33rd installment of the European top-tier level professional basketball club competition FIBA European Champions Cup (now called EuroLeague), running from September 28, 1989 to April 19, 1990. The trophy was won by the title holder Jugoplastika, who defeated FC Barcelona by a result of 72–67 at Pabellón Príncipe Felipe in Zaragoza, Spain.  Overall, Maes Pils achieved in present competition a record of 3 wins against 1 defeat, in two successive rounds. More detailed:

First round
 Tie played on September 28, 1989 and on October 5, 1989.

|}

Top 16
 Tie played on October 26, 1989 and on November 2, 1989.

|}

1990–91 FIBA European Champions Cup, 1st–tier
The 1990–91 FIBA European Champions Cup was the 34th installment of the European top-tier level professional basketball club competition FIBA European Champions Cup (now called EuroLeague), running from September 27, 1990 to April 18, 1991. The trophy was won by the title holder Pop 84, who defeated -for second consecutive time- FC Barcelona by a result of 70–65 at Palais Omnisports de Paris-Bercy, in Paris, France.  Overall, Maes Pils achieved in present competition a record of 3 wins against 1 defeat, in two successive rounds. More detailed:

First round
 Tie played on September 27, 1990 and on October 4, 1990.

|}

Top 16
 Tie played on October 25, 1990 and on November 1, 1990.

|}

1991–92 FIBA European League, 1st–tier
The 1991–92 FIBA European League was the 35th installment of the European top-tier level professional club competition for basketball clubs (now called EuroLeague), running from September 12, 1991 to April 16, 1992. The trophy was won by Partizan, who defeated Montigalà Joventut by a result of 71–70 at held at Abdi İpekçi Arena in Istanbul, Turkey.  Overall, Maes Pils achieved in present competition a record of 8 wins against 10 defeats, in three successive rounds. More detailed:

First round
 Tie played on September 11, 1991 and on September 19, 1991.

|}

Second round
 Tie played on October 3, 1991 and on October 10, 1991.

|}

Top 16
 Day 1 (October 31, 1991)

|}

 Day 2 (November 7, 1991)

|}

 Day 3 (November 28, 1991)

|}

 Day 4 (December 5, 1991)

|}

 Day 5 (December 12, 1991)

|}

 Day 6 (December 19, 1991)

|}

 Day 7 (January 9, 1992)

|}

 Day 8 (January 16, 1992)

|}

 Day 9 (January 23, 1992)

|}

 Day 10 (January 30, 1992)

|}

 Day 11 (February 6, 1992)

|}

 Day 12 (February 13, 1992)

|}

 Day 13 (February 20, 1992)

|}

 Day 14 (February 27, 1992)

|}

 Group B standings:

*Due to the Yugoslav Wars after the Breakup of Yugoslavia, the three former Yugoslav teams entering this Group Stage are forced to play all their home games outside their country. Curiously, all of them chose Spanish cities as their new "home court": Eventual winner Partizan played in Fuenlabrada, title holder Slobodna Dalmacija in A Coruña and Cibona in Puerto Real.

1992–93 FIBA European League, 1st–tier
The 1992–93 FIBA European League was the 36th installment of the European top-tier level professional club competition for basketball clubs (now called EuroLeague), running from September 10, 1992 to April 15, 1993. The trophy was won by Limoges CSP, who defeated Benetton Treviso by a result of 59–55 at Peace and Friendship Stadium in Piraeus, Greece.  Overall, Maes Pils achieved in present competition a record of 4 wins against 14 defeats, in three successive rounds. More detailed:

First round
 Tie played on September 10, 1992 and on September 16, 1992.

|}

Second round
 Tie played on October 1, 1992 and on October 8, 1992.

|}

Top 16
 Day 1 (October 28, 1992)

|}
*Overtime at the end of regulation (93–93).

 Day 2 (November 5, 1992)

|}

 Day 3 (November 26, 1992)

|}

 Day 4 (December 2, 1992)

|}

 Day 5 (December 9, 1992)

|}

 Day 6 (December 17, 1992)

|}

 Day 7 (January 7, 1993)

|}

 Day 8 (January 14, 1993)

|}

 Day 9 (January 21, 1993)

|}

 Day 10 (January 28, 1993)

|}

 Day 11 (February 3, 1993)

|}
*Overtime at the end of regulation (83–83).

 Day 12 (February 11, 1993)

|}
*Overtime at the end of regulation (79–79).

 Day 13 (February 17, 1993)

|}

 Day 14 (February 24, 1993)

|}

 Group B standings:

1993–94 FIBA European League, 1st–tier
The 1993–94 FIBA European League was the 37th installment of the European top-tier level professional club competition for basketball clubs (now called EuroLeague), running from September 9, 1993 to April 21, 1994. The trophy was won by 7up Joventut, who defeated Olympiacos by a result of 59–57 at Yad Eliyahu Arena in Tel Aviv, Israel.  Overall, Maes Pils achieved in present competition a record of 9 wins against 7 defeats, in two successive rounds. More detailed:

Second round
 Tie played on September 30, 1993 and on October 7, 1993.

|}

Top 16
 Day 1 (October 28, 1993)

|}

 Day 2 (November 3, 1993)

|}

 Day 3 (November 24, 1993)

|}

 Day 4 (December 1, 1993)

|}

 Day 5 (December 9, 1993)

|}

 Day 6 (December 15, 1993)

|}

 Day 7 (January 6, 1994)

|}

 Day 8 (January 12, 1994)

|}

 Day 9 (January 20, 1994)

|}

 Day 10 (January 27, 1994)

|}

 Day 11 (February 2, 1994)

|}

 Day 12 (February 10, 1994)

|}

 Day 13 (February 16, 1994)

|}

 Day 14 (February 23, 1994)

|}

 Group A standings:

1994–95 FIBA European League, 1st–tier
The 1994–95 FIBA European League was the 38th installment of the European top-tier level professional club competition for basketball clubs (now called EuroLeague), running from September 8, 1994 to April 13, 1995. The trophy was won by Real Madrid Teka, who defeated Olympiacos by a result of 73–61 at Pabellón Príncipe Felipe in Zaragoza, Spain.  Overall, Maes Flandria achieved in present competition a record of 1 win against 1 defeat, in only one round. More detailed:

Second round
 Tie played on September 29, 1994 and on October 6, 1994.

|}

In losers of the second round in this competition are given a wild card to participate in the third round of 1994–95 FIBA European Cup, European 2nd-tier level professional club competition for basketball clubs (later called FIBA Saporta Cup):

Third round, 1994–95 FIBA European Cup, 2nd–tier
 Tie played on October 25, 1994 and on November 2, 1994.

|}

Top 12, 1994–95 FIBA European Cup, 2nd–tier
 Day 1 (November 22, 1994)

|}

 Day 2 (November 29, 1994)

|}

 Day 3 (December 6, 1994)

|}

 Day 4 (December 14, 1994)

|}

 Day 5 (January 4, 1995)

|}

 Day 6 (January 10, 1995)

|}

 Day 7 (January 18, 1995)

|}

 Day 8 (January 24, 1995)

|}

 Day 9 (January 31, 1995)

|}

 Day 10 (February 8, 1995)

|}

 Group A standings:

Overall, Maes Flandria achieved in present competition a record of 6 wins against 6 defeats, in two successive rounds.

External links
FIBA Europe
Euroleague
ULEB
Eurocup

References

R.C. Mechelen (basketball)